Hiba Qadir better known as Hiba Bukhari is a Pakistani television actress.
Hiba Bukhari is know for  her role of Seemal in the Hum TV's Thori Si Wafa (2017) for which she won the Hum Award for Best Soap Actress and Khajistah Dilawar Khan In Meray Humnasheen .She has also played  her leading roles in Bholi Bano (2017), Silsilay (2018), Ramz-e-Ishq (2019), Deewangi (2019) and Fitoor (2021), Inteha e Ishq (2021)

Early life
Hiba was born in Karachi to a Sindhi family on 29 June 1994. She obtained her F.Sc from Jinnah Government College in Nazimabad.

Her first TV appearance was on Geo TV's Teri Meri Jodi, in a supporting role. She then appeared in a leading role in Bholi Bano, in which she played an innocent girl opposite Syed Jibran. Her appearance in Hum TV's soap opera Thori Si Wafa gained her recognition and also an award for the Best Soap Actress at the Hum Awards. She also appeared in the anthology series Yeh Ishq Hai, in a short episode Teri Meri Kahani opposite Agha Ali. In 2018, she appeared as mischievous Hira in Silsilay with Junaid Khan and later in Haara Dil opposite Danish Taimoor. Subsequently, she portrayed Nageen and Dilnasheen in Deewangi and Fitoor, respectively.

Television

Telefilms & Other Appearances

Awards and nominations

References

External links

Living people
21st-century Pakistani actresses
Pakistani television actresses
1994 births